Saint Peter-Marian Central Catholic Junior-Senior High School, was a private, coeducational Catholic junior high and senior high school in Worcester, Massachusetts, United States. The school was more commonly referred to as St. Peter-Marian, or informally as SPM or St. Peter's.  It was one of four high schools operated by the Roman Catholic Diocese of Worcester and was accredited by The New England Association of Schools & Colleges in 1969.

Campus and location
Saint Peter-Marian's campus was situated upon a hill in a residential neighborhood on Grove St in Worcester, less than one mile from the border with the town of Holden, Massachusetts. There was one main building with an annex that housed both the senior and junior high school. The campus also contained a football field, a baseball field, a softball field and a large parking lot.

History
The name Saint Peter-Marian comes from the two schools that formed it: Saint Peter's High School and Marian High School. There are four dates on the SPM seal. The year 1921 refers to the year in which Saint Peter's High School was established, on Main Street. St Peter's was a coeducational parish school operated by the Sisters of St. Joseph. The building is now occupied by St. Peter Central Catholic Elementary School. The year 1963 refers to the year in which Marian High School was built, an all-female school which was located on the Grove Street site of Saint Peter-Marian. Marian High School had a freshman class of 97 young women; the school was operated by the Sisters of Mercy. The year 1976 refers to the merging of St. Peter's High School and Marian High School to form Saint Peter-Marian High School. The year 1989 refers to the time at which the junior high school was implemented.

In 2003 the campus was expanded through the purchase of a nearby nursing home, which was extensively renovated and served as the building for the junior high school. The Junior High later moved back into the senior high school building. The school leased the old nursing home to Little Ones Child Care, a childcare agency.

In December 2019 the Archdiocese of Worcester announced that the school would close at the end academic year and merge with Holy Name, creating a new school to be named St Paul Diocesan Junior/Senior High School. The new school is located at the campus of Holy Name in Worcester.

Administration and faculty
The superintendent of the Diocese of Worcester is Dr. David Perda, and the principal of the school is Mr. William Driscoll.

There were approximately 40 members of the teaching faculty at Saint Peter-Marian, all of whom were laypersons.

Academics
Saint Peter-Marian had high academic standards for its students. All students were required to earn 24 credits in order to graduate. This typically involved 4 years of religion, 4 years of mathematics, 4 years of English, 2–3 years of foreign language, 3–4 years of history and social studies, a half year of computer studies and an elective course.

The five core academic subjects in the curriculum were English, social studies, mathematics, science, and religion. Students could also take elective classes in foreign language, health, computer science, art, music, theater, business, and marketing. Students could also study Spanish and French.

Saint Peter-Marian offered a strong Advanced Placement curriculum for students in grades ten through twelve. In the 2006 school year, 92 students took 155 AP exams. The percentage of students with a passing grade was 82%, compared to a national average of about 60%. AP Scholar awards were granted to 16 students, 7 of them AP Scholars With Honor and 9 AP Scholars With Distinction.

The school became a member of Virtual High School in 2004. The VHS program allowed students to take courses via Internet instruction in many subjects that were not offered on site at St. Peter-Marian.

Athletics
SPM had long had a solid tradition of both boys and girls athletics. The school had approximately 50 boys and girls sports teams that participated on the varsity, junior varsity, freshman, and junior high level. Saint Peter-Marian athletic teams generally competed at the Division 1 or Division 1A level and the school was a member of the Massachusetts Interscholastic Athletic Association.

The annual Thanksgiving football game against St. John's High School of Shrewsbury, MA was the oldest continuous Catholic school rivalry in the country. It was held at Fitton Field at the College of the Holy Cross.

Boys at Saint Peter-Marian participated in the following sports: cross country, soccer, golf, football, basketball, indoor track, skiing, ice hockey, baseball, track & field, tennis and lacrosse. Girls participated in cross country, soccer, field hockey, volleyball, swimming and diving, basketball, competitive cheerleading, indoor track, skiing, tennis, softball, track & field, golf, dance and lacrosse.

The Girls Cheerleading team won the Regional Championship consecutively in 2006, 2007, and 2008, as well as Winter 2015 and 2016. In 2006 and 2007 the Boys Tennis team competed in the state semi-finals. The Boys Baseball team had one of the strongest reputations in Central Massachusetts, having advanced to district play for 18 straight years. The team was the state finalist in 2004, 2008 and 2015. The Girls Softball team went undefeated in the 2015 season including winning the State Championship. The Boys Football team had a highly successful run in the 1990s, winning 5 league Super Bowls and ranking seventh in Massachusetts in 1994.

Student activities

Students at Saint Peter-Marian participated in the following school-sponsored organizations: Art Club (Jr. and Sr. High), Best Buddies, Campus Minister Team, Chorus (Jr. and Sr. High), Class Officers, Computer Club, Declamation Club (Jr. High), Eucharistic Ministers, Fair Tax Club, French Club, Guardian Globe, Guardians for Life, Habitat for Humanity, Junior High Speech Club Linus Club (Jr. High), Literary Magazine, Liturgical Choir, Math Club (Jr. High), Math Team, Mock Trial Team, Model UN (Junior High), Musicians Club, Mustard Seed, National Honor Society, National Jr. Honor Society (Jr. High), Peer Educators, Retreat Team, SADD Sr. High, Science Club (Jr. High), Scrapbook Club, Serviam Club (Jr. High), Ski Club (Jr. High), Special Olympics, Student Council, Theater (Jr. and Sr. High) and Yearbook (Jr. and Sr. High).

Each year the Theater Arts Department put on a theater production, one each for the junior and senior high school. Senior high school productions included Cinderella, The Sound of Music, Shout! The Mod Musical, and Pippin.

In 2003, the Best Buddies International program of Saint Peter-Marian was recognized as the country's best program. In 2006, the SPM Mock Trial team was a district finalist.

College placement

Saint Peter-Marian offered a full college preparatory program. From 2005 to 2009, approximately 90% of students enrolled in a four-year college after graduation, while approximately 8% enrolled in a two-year college.

Among the prestigious colleges and universities in which graduates of Saint Peter-Marian have enrolled include Amherst College, St. Bonaventure University, Boston College, Boston University, College of the Holy Cross, Dartmouth College, Fordham University, Franklin W. Olin College of Engineering, Brandeis University, Clark University, The George Washington University, Plymouth State University, Georgetown University, Harvard University, Rensselaer Polytechnic Institute, Tufts University, United States Naval Academy, University of Rochester, Valparaiso University and Worcester Polytechnic Institute.

Notable alumni
 Jerry Azumah, former professional football player for the Chicago Bears, Pro Bowl participant, and current sports television analyst
Christopher Boffoli, fine art, commercial and editorial photographer
 Frank Carroll, professional figure skating coach (graduate of St. Peter's High School)
 Rich Gedman, former Red Sox player, current Worcester Red Sox hitting coach
 Denis Leary, actor and comedian
 J.D. Power III, founder of JD Power and Associates
 J.P. Ricciardi, former Toronto Blue Jays General Manager and current New York Mets executive
 Tanyon Sturtze, former Major League pitcher

References

External links

 Official School website

Catholic secondary schools in Massachusetts
Educational institutions established in 1976
High schools in Worcester, Massachusetts
Educational institutions established in 1921
1921 establishments in Massachusetts